This is a list of members elected to the 1st Nepalese Constituent Assembly at the 2008 Nepalese Constituent Assembly election and subsequent by-elections.

The list is arranged by constituency for members elected through direct elections and by last name for members elected through the party list. Subas Chandra Nemwang served as chairman, Pushpa Kamal Dahal, Madhav Kumar Nepal, Jhala Nath Khanal and Baburam Bhattarai served as prime ministers.

Constituent Assembly composition

List of members elected by party

Party changes or defections

By-elections or replacements

References

External links 

 संविधान सदस्यमा मनोनयन गरिएको सूचना 
 निर्वाचन आयोगको सूचना, उमेद्वारहरु संविधान सभाको सदस्यमा निर्वाचित
नेपालको निर्वाचनको इतिहास (Electoral History of Nepal) (in Nepali) 
संसदीय विवरण पुस्तिका, संविधान सभा व्यवस्थापिका-संसद (२०६५ - २०६९) (Parliamentary Report Booklet, Constituent Assembly Legislature Parliament (2008 - 2012)) (in Nepali)

Constituent Assembly Election
Constituent Assembly Election 2008
2008-related lists